The 2018 Kentucky Wildcats men's soccer team represented the University of Kentucky during the 2018 NCAA Division I men's soccer season. It was the 28th season of the university fielding a men's varsity soccer program, and their 14th season playing in Conference USA as an associate member since their main conference, the Southeastern Conference does not sponsor men's varsity soccer.

The 2018 season proved to be the program's most successful season ever. Kentucky finished the regular season ranked third in the United Soccer Coaches men's soccer poll, as well as the Conference USA Men's Soccer Tournament and regular season champions. The program made their deepest run in the NCAA Tournament, reaching the Elite Eight before being eliminated by Maryland.

Background 
During the 2017 season, Kentucky finished with an 8–6–4 overall record and a 4–2–2 record in Conference USA matches. An early season surge had the Wildcats ranked as high as 13th in the nation. A dip in form saw the Wildcats fall out of the rankings and eventually out of the NCAA Tournament picture. Kentucky were seeded third in the 2017 Conference USA Men's Soccer Tournament, where they were upset by Marshall, 0–1, in the quarterfinals. They did not receive an at-large bid to the 2017 NCAA Division I Men's Soccer Tournament.

Player movement

Players leaving

Players arriving

Squad

Roster 
Updated November 13, 2018

Team management 

Source:

Schedule 

Source:

|-
!colspan=6 style=""| Regular season

|-
!colspan=6 style=""| Conference USA Tournament
|-

|-
!colspan=6 style=""| NCAA Tournament
|-

|-

Statistics

Awards and honors

Rankings

References 

Kentucky Wildcats men's soccer seasons
Kentucky
Kentucky
Kentucky Wildcats, soccer
Kentucky